Pierre Ferri (3 September 1904 – 23 November 1993) was a French stockbroker and conservative politician who was Minister of Posts, Telegraphs, and Telephones in 1953–54.

Early years (1904–45)

Pierre Ferri was born in Paris on 3 September 1904. His father was Louis Ferri, a stockbroker.
Pierre Ferri obtained a degree in Law, and graduated from the Ecole libre des sciences politiques (Free School of Political Science).
He then became a stockbroker.
He was mobilized in 1939 at the outbreak of World War II (1939–45) and participated in the fighting in France.
He fought again in 1944 and 1945.
He was awarded the Croix de guerre 1939–1945 and was made a Knight of the Legion of Honor.

Political career (1945–55)

Pierre Ferri was a Gaullist who leaned towards the right.
In the elections for the first Constituent Assembly on 21 October 1945 he ran for the 2nd district of the Seine on the platform of the Union républicaine nationale démocratique (National Democratic Republican Union) but was not elected.
He ran against in the 2 June 1946 elections for the second Constituent Assembly for the Parti républicain de la liberté (PRL, Republican Party of Liberty) but was not elected.
In the parliamentary elections of 10 November 1946 Ferri again failed to win a seat.

Ferri  was a member of the national council of the Rassemblement du peuple français (RPF, Rally of the French People), a coalition that included the PRL.
In November 1947 Ferri was elected municipal councilor of Paris and general counsel of the Seine on the PRL platform.
He was one of nine PRL councilors.
From 1947 he was chairman of the Budget Committee of the city of Paris, and from 1950 was deputy chairman of the city council.
In 1950 Ferri was a committee member of Les Bibliophiles de France.

Ferri ran successfully for election to the legislature for the 2nd district of the Seine on 17 June 1951 on the RPF platform.
In 1951 Ferri supported Henri Ulver and several other Gaullist deputes in proposing a law to restore various powers to the Paris municipal council that had been removed, and to make some changes to the way its assemblies functioned.
In 1953 there were just 27 RPF members on the council including Ferri.
Ferri was reelected in the Paris municipal elections of the Spring of 1953, one of a number of deputies to also sit on the council, but resigned soon after.

In the legislature Ferri sat on the Finance Committee and on the subcommittee that monitored spending on national defense. He submitted many bills or amendments related to financial issues.
On 28 June 1953 he joined the cabinet of Joseph Laniel as Minister of PTT.
The cabinet fell on 12 June 1954 and Ferri again sat on the Finance committee.
In the elections of 2 January 1956 Ferri was not reelected.
He was again elected to the legislature in November 1958 as member for the 22nd district of the Seine.
Ferri was elected deputy for the Plaine Monceaux in the 17th arrondissement, running against a Gaullist Union for the New Republic candidate.
He held his seat until 1962.

In 1966 Ferri was president of the Paris regional federation of the Independent Republicans led by Valéry Giscard d'Estaing. 
Jacques Feron, another former deputy, was secretary-general.
Pierre Ferri died in Paris on 23 November 1993 aged 89.

Notes

Sources

1904 births
1993 deaths
Politicians from Paris
Republican Party of Liberty politicians
Rally of the French People politicians
National Centre of Social Republicans politicians
National Centre of Independents and Peasants politicians
Independent Republicans politicians
Government ministers of France
Deputies of the 2nd National Assembly of the French Fourth Republic
Deputies of the 1st National Assembly of the French Fifth Republic
French military personnel of World War II
Chevaliers of the Légion d'honneur